The following outline is provided as an overview of and topical guide to books:

Book – set of written, printed, illustrated, or blank sheets, made of ink, paper, parchment, or other materials, usually fastened together to hinge at one side.

What type of thing is a book?  

A book is a medium for a collection of words and/or pictures to represent knowledge, often manifested in bound paper and ink, or in electronic format such as e-books.

Books can be described as all of the following:
 Type of publication
 Format of literature

Types of books 
Physical types of books not to be confused with literary genres or types of literature.
 Advance copy –  a free promotional copy of a book given by a publisher to booksellers, librarians, journalists, or others, or as a contest or school prize, before the book is printed for mass distribution. 
 Alphabet book –  a book primarily designed for young children representing letters of the alphabet with corresponding words and/or images. 
 Alternative formats – another version of a standard printed book such as audio, braille, electronic or large print versions  
 Audiobook – a recorded reading of a physical book 
 Autograph book – a book for collecting the autographs of others
 Confession album – a type of autograph book with set of questions 
 Banned book – a book or other printed works which are prohibited by law or to which free access is not permitted by other means 
 Bestseller – a book that is included on a list of top-selling or frequently-borrowed titles 
 Blook – a printed book that contains or is based on content from a blog 
 Board book –  a type of book printed on thick paperboard generally for children 
 Book-and-record set – a set consisting of a picture storybook and an accompanying recording 
 Book series –  sequence of books that are formally identified together as a group  
 Booklet – a small book or group of pages
 Chapbook – an early type of cheap popular literature printed in early modern Europe in booklet format
 Tract – booklets used for religious and political purposes
 Boxed Set – a compilation of books packaged in a box, for sale as a single unit
 Braille book – a book that is traditionally written with embossed paper for the blind or visually impaired  
 Chapter book – a story book intended for intermediate readers, generally age 7–10 
 Codex – a bound book constructed of a number of sheets of paper, vellum, papyrus, or similar materials 
 Coffee table book – an oversized, usually hard-covered book whose purpose is for display on a table 
 Coloring book – a book containing line art to which a reader may add color using crayons, colored pencils, marker pens, paint or other artistic media 
 Comic book –  a book or magazine that consists of comic art in the form of sequential juxtaposed panels that represent individual scenes 
 Comedia suelta – an individual printing of a play 
 Condolence book – a book in which people may record their condolences after a death or great tragedy. 
 Cookbook – a collection of recipes 
 Cordel literature – printed booklets or pamphlets containing folk novels, poems and songs.
 Diary and Journals – a private collection of thoughts or feelings, remembrances including comments on current events in book format
 Commonplace book – writing information into books to compile knowledge 
 Dream diary – a diary for recording dreams 
 Personal Diary – a record (originally in handwritten format) with discrete entries arranged by date reporting on what has happened over the course of a day or other period 
 Scrapbook – a method, an art for preserving, presenting, arranging personal and family history in the form of a book
 Travelogue or Travel Journal – is a record made by a traveller, sometimes in diary form, of the traveler's experiences, written during the course of the journey and later edited for publication 
 E-book or Electronic Book – a book made available in digital form, consisting of text, images, or both readable on electronic devices 
 Edited volume or collection – a collection of scholarly or scientific chapters written by different authors in book form 
 Exhibition catalogue – a book which is either a printed list of exhibits at an art exhibition or a directory of exhibitors at a trade fair or business-to-business event 
 Festival book –  a book that commemorate a notable event such as a royal entry, coronation or wedding 
 First Edition – a book from the first print run  
 Festschrift –  a book honoring a respected person, especially an academic, and presented during his or her lifetime 
 Flip book – a book with a series of pictures that vary gradually from one page to the next, so that when the pages are turned rapidly, the pictures appear to animate by simulating motion or some other change 
 Hardcover –  a book bound with rigid protective covers (typically of cardboard covered with buckram or other cloth, heavy paper, or occasionally leather) with a sewn spine.  
 Illuminated manuscript – a book in which the text is supplemented with such decoration as initials, borders (marginalia) and miniature illustrations 
 Incunable – an early printed book (before 1501) 
 Instant book  – a book that has been produced and published very quickly to meet market demand 
 Interactive children's book – a subset of children's books that require participation and interaction by the reader 
 Large-print book – a book with large text for the visually impaired 
 Limited edition book –  book that is released in a limited quantity print run 
 Liturgical book – a book published by the authority of a church, that contains the text and directions for the liturgy of its official religious services. 
 Magazine – a collection of written articles published on a schedule 
 Mapback – an early form of a paperback with a printed map on the back cover 
 Midlist – a book that is not a bestseller, but has strong enough sales to justify its publication 
 Miniature book – a very small book 
 Miscellany – a collection of various pieces of writing by different authors 
 Monograph – a book on a single subject or an aspect of a subject, usually by a single author 
 Networked book or Open book – a book that is written, edited, and read in a networked environment (such as Wikipedia) 
 Novelization – a book that adapts the story of a work created for another medium, such as a film, TV series, comic strip or video game 
 Online book – a book that is only available to be read on the Internet 
 Out-of-print book – a book no longer being actively published 
 Paperback –  book characterized by a thick paper or paperboard cover, and often held together with glue rather than stitches or staples
 Mass-market paperback – small, usually non-illustrated, inexpensive bookbinding format 
 Trade paperback – a higher-quality paperback book
 Personalized book – a book that has been customized for someone, containing personalized text, customized illustrations, or variables, based on the characteristics of that person 
 Photobook – a book consisting mainly of photographs 
 Picture book – a book that combines visual and written text and often aimed at children 
 Pop-up book or Movable book – a three-dimensional book 
 Punch out book – a book printed on stiff card or cardboard usually comprising several pages of perforated, colorfully printed figures or shapes 
 Reference Book
 Catalogue raisonné – annotated listing of all the known artworks by an artist either in a particular medium or all media 
 Encyclopedia – a type of reference work or compendium holding a comprehensive summary of information from either all branches of knowledge or a particular branch of knowledge 
 Herbal – a book containing the names and descriptions of plants 
 Remaindered book –a liquidated book 
 Samut khoi – a folding-book manuscript 
 Scroll – a precursor to the book which is a roll of papyrus, parchment or paper containing writing 
 Song book or Chansonnier –  a book containing lyrics and notes for songs
 Choirbook –  a large format song book 
 Table-book – printed book which is arranged so that all the parts of a piece of music can be read from it while seated around a table 
 Sticker album –  a book in which a person sticks collectable stickers in designated sections 
 Tankōbon –  Japanese term for a book that is a stand-alone story and not part of a series 
 Textbook – manual of instruction in any branch of study 
 Tie-in –  a book based on a media property such as a film, video game, television series, board game, web site, role-playing game or literary property that serve as cross-promotion 
 Used book – a previously owned book 
 Volume (bibliography) – a single book that is part of a larger collection 
 Wallbook – large printed book that is designed also to be mounted on a wall 
 Yearbook – a book that is published annually

Physical properties of a book 

 Book size – the dimensions of a book
 Leaf – a single sheet, the left-hand page of which is the verso, and right-hand page is the recto
 Page – one side of a leaf of paper.
 Title page, often with the imprint page on its verso.
 Half-title
 Ink – a type of pigment used to write letters upon the pages of a book
 Paper – a material that easily absorbs ink, made from ground plant cellulose.
 Parchment – a heavier alternative to paper, often made of reeds, cotton, or animal hide.
 Book cover – protective covering used to bind together the pages of a book.
  Dust jacket – detachable outer cover, usually made of paper and printed with text and illustrations. This outer cover has folded flaps that hold it to the front and back book covers.

Contents of a book

Subject matter 
 Literature (outline) – prose, written oral, including fiction and non-fiction, drama and poetry.
 List of Literary or Writing Genres – writing genres are determined by narrative technique, tone, content, and sometimes length
 Fiction (outline) – classification for any story or universe derived from imagination—and not based strictly on history or fact
 Literary fiction (outline) – type of fiction that focuses more on analyzing the human condition than on plot
 Genre fiction – plot-driven fictional works written with the intent of fitting into a specific literary genre
 non-fiction – type of content whose creator (in good faith) assumes responsibility for the truth or accuracy of events, people, or information presented
 Reference work – a book or periodical (or its electronic equivalent) to which one can refer for information.

Structure of book content 
Book design – the common structural parts of a book include:
 Front cover: hardbound or softcover (paperback); the spine is the binding that joins the front and rear covers where the pages hinge.
 Front endpaper  – the endpapers of a book are pages that consist of a double-size sheet folded, the front endpaper and the flyleaf. 
 Flyleaf: The blank leaf or leaves following the front free endpaper.
 Front matter – the first section of a book
 Frontispiece – a decorative illustration on the verso facing the title page
 Title page – repeats the title and author as printed on the cover or spine. 
 Copyright page: – typically verso of title page: shows copyright owner/date, credits, edition/printing, cataloguing details
 Table of contents – a list of the chapter headings and nested sub-headings with their respective page numbers
 List of figures – often included in technical books, a list of drawings or depictions in the book
 List of tables – often included in technical books, a list of data in rows and columns, or possibly in more complex structure. 
 Dedication – an inscription which is the expression of friendly connection or thanks by the author towards another person. 
 Acknowledgments – a place in the book where the author gives expression of gratitude for assistance in creating an original work. This may also be placed in Back Matter. 
 Foreword – a short piece of writing sometimes placed at the beginning of a book and typically written by someone other than the primary author. 
 Preface – a short introduction to a book written by the work's author. The preface usually describes how the book came into being and may contain thanks or acknowledgments.
 Introduction – the beginning section that states the purpose and the goals of the book
 Body – the main text or contents of the book, the pages often collected or folded into signatures; the pages are usually numbered sequentially, and often divided into chapters. Chapters may also have titles, and in a few cases an epigraph or prefatory quotation.
 Back matter – also known as end matter is the final section of the book it can contain a number of items
 Epilogue – a piece of writing at the end of the a book which brings closure to the work. 
 Afterword – a piece of writing covering the story of how the book came into being
 Appendix – supplemental addition to the given work that details information found in the body
 Glossary – a set of definitions of words important to the work. 
 Index – a list of terms and references used in the text often with page numbers to where the terms can be found in the work. 
 Notes – a list of author comments or citations of a reference work, these may also be found within the main text at the bottom of a page.
 Bibliography – a list of the works consulted when writing the body
 Colophon – a brief description with production notes relevant to the edition and may include a printer's mark or logotype.
 Flyleaf – The blank leaf or leaves (if any) preceding the back free endpaper.
 Rear endpaper – the endpapers of a book are pages that consist of a double-size sheet folded, the rear end or backend paper the first of which is a flyleaf. 
 Back cover – the back cover of a book which usually contains biographical matter, a summary of the book as well as the ISBN and publisher's price for the book.

Study of books 

 Bibliography – the academic study of books as physical and cultural objects.
 Enumerative bibliography – the organized listing of books
 Descriptive bibliography – description of books as physical objects
 Analytical bibliography – examination of the physical features of book as artifact
 List of bibliographies – list of bibliographies on Wikipedia
 Literature – any single body of written works
 Media studies – the discipline and field of study dealing with content, history and effects of various media including print.

Book collections 

 Library – any single body of written works
 Digital library – library that houses digital resources
 Library science – field that applies the practices, perspectives, and tools of management, information technology, education and other areas to libraries.
 List of libraries
 List of libraries in the ancient world
 List of national and state libraries
 Private library – a library held by a private citizen
 Public lending libraries – a library that provides service to the general public
 Research library – a collection of materials on one more subjects
 Special library – specialized library providing resources on a particular topic
 Corporate library– specialized library serving staff at business or corporation
 Federal Library – specialized library of a government
 Law library – specialized library devoted to law
 Medical library– specialized library focused on medical and health knowledge
 Museum Library – specialized library within a museum
 Music library– specialized library designed for the needs of musicians
 News Library – specialized library of news articles and news-related items
 Performing Arts Library – specialized library focusing on performing arts including music, theatre, dance, film and recorded sound
 Presidential library – research library with the collection of a president's papers
 Theological Library– specialized library devoted to the study of theology
 Transportation Library– specialized library devoted to transportation

Book identification and classification

Classification systems 
 Bliss bibliographic classification (BC) – library classification system created by Henry E. Bliss and published in four volumes between 1940 and 1953.  
 Chinese Library Classification (CLC) – national Chinese library classification system
 Colon Classification  – library classification system mainly used in India
 Dewey Decimal Classification (DDC)  – library classification system first published by Melvil Dewey in 1876
 Harvard-Yenching Classification  – library classification system used for Chinese language materials in the United States. 
 Library of Congress Classification (LCC) – library classification system developed by the Library of Congress and used by most research and academic libraries in the United States. 
 Universal Decimal Classification (UDC)  – international library classification system

History of books 

History of books
 History of writing – the development of expressing language by letters or other marks. 
 History of scrolls – the history of a roll of papyrus, parchment or paper containing writing.
 History of the codex – the history of a book with handwritten content
 List of codices – list of codices published from late antiquity through the Middle Ages. 
Aztec codices – list of books written by pre-Columbian and colonial-era Aztecs.
Maya codices – the history of folding books written by pre-Columbian Mayans.
 History of printing – the history of the duplication of images 
Woodblock printing (pre- 220 AD) – technique for printing text, images or patterns originating in China in antiquity. 
Movable type (1040) – the system and technology of printing and typography using moveable components to reproduce elements of a document.  
Printing press (1454) – a device for applying pressure to an inked surface resting on a print medium such as paper or cloth, and thereby transferring ink.
Etching (ca. 1500) – a method of printmaking using acid or mordant to cut into a metal surface to create a design in the metal.
Mezzotint (1642) – the system and technology of printing and typography using moveable components to reproduce elements of a document.
Aquatint (1768) – a variant of etching.
Lithography (1796) – method of printing using an image drawn with oil, fat or wax onto the surface of a lithographic limestone plate.
Chromolithography (1837) – a method for making multi-color prints.
Rotary press (1843) – a printing press in which images to be printed are curved around a cylinder.
Offset printing (1875) – a printing technique in which inked image is transferred from a plate to a rubber blanket and then to the printing surface.
Hectograph (19th century)  – a printing process that involves transfer of an original to a pan of gelatin or gelatin pad pulled over a metal frame.
Hot metal typesetting (1886)  –a typesetting method where molten-type metal is injected into a mold and the resulting slugs are used to press ink onto paper.
Screen printing (1907) – a printing technique where a mesh is used to transfer ink onto a substrate. 
Digital press (1993) – method of printing from a digital-based image directly to a variety of media.

Book production 

 Publishing – the dissemination of literature and making information available to the general public.
 Writing – a medium of human communication representing language and emotion.
Author – the creator or originator of written work. 
 Editing – the process of selecting and preparing media used to convey information.
 Graphic Design – process of visual communication and problem-solving through the use of typography, photography, and illustration. 
 Printing – process of reproducing text and images using a master form or template.
 Bookbinding – process of physically assembling a book of codex format from an ordered stack of paper sheets and bound together.

Book distribution 
 Bookselling – the commercial trading of books 
Book sales club – a subscription-based method of selling and purchasing books
List of bookstore chains – larger bookselling businesses, usually with multiple locations in a large geographic location
List of independent bookstores – small bookselling businesses, usually with one or a small number of locations in a limited geographic location
Lists of publishing companies
 Libraries – a collection of sources of information and similar resources
 List of libraries

Politics of books 

 Book censorship – is when some authority, government or otherwise takes measures to prevent access to a book or to part of its contents.   
 Book burning – ritual destruction by fire of books and other written materials, usually carried out in a public context. 
 List of books banned by governments
 Book censorship by country
 Book censorship in Canada
 Book censorship in China
 Book censorship in Iran
 Book censorship in the Republic of Ireland
 Book censorship in the United States

Book culture 

 Bibliophilia – the love of books and a bibliophile is an individual who loves and frequently reads books 
 Book discussion club – a group of people who meet to discuss a book or books that they have read
 Book collecting – the collecting of books, including seeking, locating, acquiring, organizing, cataloging, displaying, storing and maintaining 
 Book review – a form of literary criticism in which a book is analyzed based on content, style, and merit

Countries and books

 History of the book in Brazil
 Book publishers in Upper Canada (1791–1841)
 Publishing industry in China (includes books)
 Books in France
 Books in Germany
 Book publishing in India
 Books in Italy
 Books and publishing in Pakistan
 Books in Spain
 Books in the United Kingdom
 Books in the United States

Specific books

Books by title 

Lists of books – list of book lists (bibliographies) on Wikipedia 
 Lists of books by subject – book lists (bibliographies) by subject on Wikipedia
 Lists of books by writer – book lists (bibliographies) by writer on Wikipedia
 List of banned books – book lists (bibliographies) of banned books Wikipedia
 List of book titles taken from literature – list of books with a quotation from literature as the title for their works

Book-related organizations 
 List of booksellers' associations – a list of both booksellers' and Antiquarian booksellers' associations from around the world.

Publications about books 
New York Review of Books – an American magazine containing literary criticism, and discussions of the contents of various books.

Persons influential in relation to books 
 Johannes Gutenberg – inventor of movable type.
 Lord Stanhope – built a press out of cast iron, reducing force required by 90%, doubling the size of the printed area.

See also 

 Outline of knowledge
 Outline of literature
 Outline of library science

References

External links 

 Centre for the History of the Book
 Manuscripts, Books, and Maps: The Printing Press and a Changing World
 Old Books, How to find information on publication history and value (1998) Smithsonian Institution Libraries
 Project Gutenberg – Free e-Books

 History of books
Centre for the History of the Book
History of the Book at the American Antiquarian Society
Rare Book School at the University of Virginia
 Dan Traister's Page
Consortium of European Research Libraries
12–17th century manuscripts, including Vulgates, Books of Hours, Wills, Legal Contracts and Medicinal Texts, Center for Digital Initiatives, University of Vermont Libraries

 
Books
Books